Events from the year 1792 in Denmark.

Incumbents
 Monarch – Christian VII
 Prime minister – Andreas Peter Bernstorff

Events

May 
 16 May – * Denmark declares transatlantic slave trade illegal after 1803 (though slavery continues until 1848)

Births
 2 April – Johannes Theodorus Suhr,  businessman (died 1858)
 26 June – Christian Albrecht Jensen, portrait painter during the Danish Golden Age (died 1870)
 12 August – Hans Harder, painter and drawing master (died 1873)
 22 November – Ferdinand, Hereditary Prince of Denmark (died 1863)

Deaths
 3 March – Cathrine Marie Gielstrup, stage actress (born 1755)
 24 March – Johan Frederik Classen, Danish-Norwegian industrialist and philanthropist (born 1725).
 18 July – Christine Sophie von Gähler, courtier (born 1745)
 25 September – Adam Gottlob Moltke, Lord Chamberlain to Frederick V (born 1710)
 29 October  Cathrine Marie Gielstrup, stage actress (born 1755)

References

 
1790s in Denmark
Denmark
Years of the 18th century in Denmark